The 1978–79 SM-liiga season was the fourth season of the SM-liiga, the top level of ice hockey in Finland. 10 teams participated in the league, and Tappara Tampere won the championship.

Standings

Playoffs

Semifinal
 Ässät - HIFK 3:0 (6:5 P, 5:3, 9:4)
 Tappara - TPS 3:2 (5:1, 6:10, 7:3, 4:8, 7:5)

3rd place
 TPS - HIFK 2:1 (2:1, 2:10, 3:2)

Final
 Ässät - Tappara 2:3 (3:6, 3:4, 5:3, 3:2, 2:5)

Relegation

External links
 SM-liiga official website

1978–79 in Finnish ice hockey
Fin
Liiga seasons